Callichroma onorei is a species of beetle in the family Cerambycidae. It was described by Giesbert in 1998. It is known from Ecuador.

References

Callichromatini
Beetles described in 1998